Earl Crag is a gritstone crag and climbing area in Craven, North Yorkshire, England.  It is home to Lund's Tower, Wainman's Pinnacle, and The Hitching Stone, all of which are near Cowling.

Climbing 
Earl Crag itself is popular for climbing and has many different possible routes and climbing techniques.

The Hitching Stone 
Some people climb The Hitching Stone, which is an old gritstone erratic nearby Earl Crag.

History

Architecture

Lund’s Tower 
Lund's Tower, also known as Sutton Pinnacle, was built by James Lund on Earl Crag in 1887 and designed by R. B. Broster & Sons.

Wainman’s Pinnacle 
Wainman's Pinnacle, also known as Cowling Pinnacle, was built on Earl Crag in 1898 as a memorial to the Napoleonic Wars by a man known as Wainman, and was rebuilt by other locals in 1900 following a lightning strike.  Wainman's Pinnacle and Earl Crag can be seen from many towns and villages in the area.

Gallery

References

External links 

 Climbonline
 Peak District bouldering

Mountains and hills of North Yorkshire
Climbing areas of England